Mason Will John Greenwood (born 1 October 2001) is an English professional footballer who plays as a forward for  club Manchester United.

His senior international debut for England came in September 2020, in a UEFA Nations League game against Iceland.

In January 2022, Greenwood was arrested on suspicion of raping and assaulting a woman, and a few days later on suspicion of sexual assault and threats to kill. Since then, Greenwood has not trained with, or appeared for, either his club or his national team. He was charged in October 2022 for attempted rape, assault occasioning actual bodily harm, and controlling and coercive behaviour. All charges against him were dropped in February 2023.

Club career

Manchester United

Early career
Greenwood joined Manchester United at the age of six, playing at the club's development school in Halifax. After progressing through the academy ranks, he joined up with the Under-18 squad for the 2017–18 season, despite being eligible for the Under-16s, and finished as top scorer of the U18 Premier League North with 17 goals in 21 games. In May 2018, Greenwood was named Player of the Tournament as the youth side won the ICGT Trophy, an international youth football tournament, in the Netherlands.

2018–19 season: Debut year
In July 2018, Greenwood travelled with the first team on their pre-season tour of the United States. On 20 July, he made his non-competitive debut as a 76th-minute substitute in a 1–1 draw against Club América. On 2 October, Greenwood signed his first professional contract with the club. In December, he was selected by José Mourinho to train with the first team ahead of their UEFA Champions League match against Valencia.

On 6 March 2019, under the management of Ole Gunnar Solskjær, Greenwood made his competitive debut as an 87th-minute substitute in a 3–1 win against Paris Saint Germain in the Champions League. At the age of 17 years and 156 days, he became the second-youngest player to represent the club in a European competition (behind only Norman Whiteside) and the youngest ever in the Champions League era. Four days later, he made his Premier League debut from the bench in a 2–0 defeat to Arsenal to become one of the club's youngest league debutants.

Greenwood was named Premier League 2 Player of the Month for April 2019. At the end of the season, he received the Jimmy Murphy Young Player of the Year award, given each year to the best player in the club's youth teams. On 12 May, the final day of the season, Greenwood made his first senior start for the club in a 2–0 defeat to Cardiff City.

2019–20 season: First team breakthrough
On 7 November, he scored in United's 3–0 win over Partizan Belgrade, qualifying them for the knockout stages of the competition. On 24 November, Greenwood scored his first league goal in a 3–3 draw with Sheffield United. On 12 December, he scored twice and won a penalty in the final game of the Europa League group stage against AZ Alkmaar. Manchester United won the game 4–0 and finished top of their group.

On 11 January 2020, after failing to score in three consecutive matches, Greenwood scored once in a 4–0 win over Norwich City. Fifteen days later, he scored his first FA Cup goal as United defeated Tranmere Rovers 6–0. Greenwood scored again four weeks later, in a 3–0 league win against Watford. On 12 March, he scored his fifth European goal during a 5–0 win over LASK of Austria; becoming the first teenager to score at least five goals in a single European season for United.

After a three-month suspension of football caused by the COVID-19 pandemic, Greenwood played in all six of United's matches as of 9 July 2020. He failed to score in the first three, but delivered a total of four goals in the next three, including a brace in a 5–2 win against Bournemouth on 4 July. After that, he scored against Aston Villa; making him only the fourth player aged below 19 to score in three consecutive Premier League appearances and the first since Francis Jeffers did so for Everton in 1999.

2020–21 season: Number 11
After wearing the number 26 for his breakout season in 2019, Greenwood was given the number 11 shirt by Manchester United on 4 September 2020. He joined a famous list of players to wear the number 11, most notably Ryan Giggs, a fellow academy product who retired in 2014 as the leading appearance maker for United with 963. On 22 September, Greenwood scored his first goal of the season in a 3–1 away victory over Luton Town in the third round of the EFL Cup, and on 28 October, he scored his first goal in the UEFA Champions League in a 5–0 win over RB Leipzig; the goal came from his first ever shot in the competition. He scored his first league goal of the season in a 3–1 away win against West Ham United on 5 December.

On 24 January 2021, Greenwood scored his first FA Cup goal of the season in a 3–2 home win against arch-rivals Liverpool in the fourth round. He played the full 90 minutes in the Premier League record-equalling 9–0 home win against Southampton on 2 February, and two weeks later he extended his contract to June 2025 with the option of a further year. He broke a four-month goal drought in the league on 4 April, scoring the winner against Brighton & Hove Albion which ended 2–1 at home. Greenwood excelled in April with four league goals in four matches, including a brace against Burnley. This earnt him his first nomination for Premier League Player of the Month which was won by teammate Jesse Lingard who was on loan at West Ham. On 29 April, Greenwood scored his first goal in the UEFA Europa League for the season against Roma during the first leg of the semi-finals in a 6–2 home victory.

On 9 May, Greenwood scored another goal against Aston Villa in a 3–1 away win. Two days later, Greenwood scored against Leicester City, assisted by Amad Diallo, in a 2–1 defeat; the goal was the first time in 15 years a teenager assisted another for a Premier League goal. On 26 May, Greenwood played in his first cup final, in the 2021 Europa League against Villarreal at the Stadion Gdańsk. He played 100 minutes before being substituted in the first period of extra time for Fred; the match ended 1–1 and the Spanish club won 12–11 on penalties.

2021–22 season

On 14 August 2021, Greenwood scored his first goal of the season in a 5–1 win over Leeds in Manchester United's opening match of the 2021–22 Premier League season. Fifteen days later, he scored the goal that secured a 1–0 win over Wolverhampton Wanderers, becoming the second teenager in Premier League history after Robbie Fowler to score in each of his team's first three games of a season, and helped United breaking the record of most consecutive away matches undefeated in English football history with 28.

Greenwood had scored 32 career goals for United by the time he turned 20 in October, with only Norman Whiteside (39) and George Best (37) scoring more goals for the club as a teenager. He was one of 10 players nominated for the Kopa Trophy in 2021. In November, it was announced that he had finished fifth, behind Pedri, Jude Bellingham, Jamal Musiala and Nuno Mendes. On 8 December, Greenwood scored his first goal in the 2021–22 Champions League, against Young Boys in a 1–1 draw in interim manager Ralf Rangnick's first Champions League game with the club.

International career

Youth level
Greenwood is eligible to represent England or Jamaica at international level. He played youth international football for England's under-15, under-17, under-18 and under-21 teams.

Greenwood made six appearances for the England under-17 team between 2017 and 2018, and was part of the under-17 squad at the Algarve Tournament in Portugal. He scored one goal in five appearances for the England under-18 team, all in 2018.

On 30 August 2019, Greenwood was included in the England under-21 squad for the first time and made his debut as a 59th-minute substitute during the 3–2 win against Turkey on 6 September in qualifying for the 2021 European Under-21 Championship. He scored his first goal for the team on 19 November; equalising against the Netherlands in a match which England ultimately lost 2–1. Greenwood played four games in total at under-21 level, scoring once.

Senior level
Greenwood was named in the England senior squad for the first time on 25 August 2020. He made his debut on 5 September in a 1–0 away win over Iceland in a 2020–21 UEFA Nations League A match, coming on as a 78th-minute substitute. On 7 September, he and Phil Foden were withdrawn from the England squad after breaking COVID-19 quarantine guidelines in Iceland by leaving the part of the hotel that the squad was occupying; media reports alleged that the players had met two women in another part of the hotel.

Despite his strong start to the 2021–22 season where he had scored three goals in three games, Greenwood was not selected for the September 2021 World Cup qualifiers by England manager Gareth Southgate who stated, "He is in our thoughts, I've spoken with him and his club, he is a player we really like. We are all very conscious that he makes the progression at the right time."

Style of play
Greenwood began his career as a midfielder but gradually evolved into a centre forward. He often plays on the right flank for Manchester United, as well as moving more centrally to occupy as a second striker when the ball is fed into the penalty area. During his early career, several of his goals have seen him dropping a shoulder or chopping the ball to get it on to his left foot before scoring. He also often reverses his shot by aiming low for the near post from the right of the box.

In May 2018, former Manchester United player Clayton Blackmore said: "He's great on the ball and very good with both feet. He's the first person I've seen that takes penalties and free-kicks with his wrong foot. I've never come across anyone like that!" In March 2019, former academy coach Mark Senior said: "People says he's like the new Robin van Persie but I don't know. I think he's his own man. I've not seen another player like him. His style means his pace is deceptive because he is absolutely rapid."

In July 2019, Manchester United manager Ole Gunnar Solskjær praised Greenwood during their pre-season tour, saying: "He can play all of the front-three positions, or across the front four, as he can play number 10, number seven, number 11 and number nine. He's a natural footballer with his left foot, coming in, but he's got two feet and can play anywhere along the front. He's just a natural. When he takes a penalty with his right, then takes a penalty with his left, free-kicks with his left, free-kicks with his right. He is almost what you'd call 50:50, maybe 51:49 left-footed."

Personal life
Greenwood was born in Bradford, West Yorkshire, and raised in the Wibsey area of the city. He is of Jamaican descent. His family has a background in sports; his sister, Ashton, is a track athlete.

2022 arrests
On 30 January 2022, Greenwood was accused of assault against a woman in a series of posts on her social media. The posts included images and video of apparent injuries, as well as audio where a woman tells a man whom she called Mason: "I don't want to have sex", to which the man replies that he "doesn't care" and, when told to stop again, says: "I asked you politely, and you wouldn't do it, so what else do you want me to do?" The man later says: "Push me again one more time and watch what happens to you."

Later on 30 January, Greenwood was suspended by United, and arrested by Greater Manchester Police on suspicion of rape and assault of a woman. On 1 February, Greenwood was further arrested on suspicion of sexual assault and threats to kill. By then, sports apparel company Nike had said that it suspended its relationship with Greenwood, and video game company EA Sports had said it removed Greenwood from its FIFA games.

On 2 February, Greenwood was released on bail pending further investigation. Within a week, Nike stopped sponsoring Greenwood. In April 2022, his bail was extended to mid-June.

On 15 October 2022, Greenwood was arrested for allegedly breaching his bail conditions by contacting his accuser. The same day, he was charged with attempted rape for an alleged incident on 22 October 2021, assault occasioning actual bodily harm for an alleged incident in December 2021, and engaging in controlling and coercive behaviour from November 2018. On 17 October 2022, he was initially remanded into custody until 21 November, but on 19 October, after a private hearing at Minshull Street Crown Court, he was granted bail with conditions not to contact witnesses, including the complainant, and to reside at an address in Bowdon. On 2 February 2023, the Crown Prosecution Service dropped all charges against Greenwood, citing the withdrawal of key witnesses and "new material that came to light".

Career statistics

Club

International

Honours
Manchester United
UEFA Europa League runner-up: 2020–21

Individual
Premier League 2 Player of the Month: April 2019
Jimmy Murphy Young Player of the Year: 2018–19
IFFHS Men's Youth (U20) World Team: 2021

References

External links

Profile at the Manchester United F.C. website
Profile at the Football Association website

2001 births
Living people
People from Wibsey
Footballers from Bradford
English footballers
England youth international footballers
England under-21 international footballers
England international footballers
Association football forwards
Association football controversies
Manchester United F.C. players
Premier League players
Black British sportspeople
English sportspeople of Jamaican descent